Shirley Hall, also known as Devereaux House, is a historic home located at Virginia Beach, Virginia.  It was built in 1940, and is a two-story, five bay, Georgian Revival style brick dwelling.  The main block is covered by a hipped roof with balustrade.  A gambrel roofed service wing connects the main block to a hipped roofed garage. The interior features an entrance hall with an original Virginia staircase, removed from the Hunter House in Princess Anne County (c. 1826). The house is set in a park like setting among mature hardwood trees and American hollies.

It was added to the National Register of Historic Places in 1999.

References

Houses on the National Register of Historic Places in Virginia
Georgian Revival architecture in Virginia
Houses completed in 1940
Houses in Virginia Beach, Virginia
National Register of Historic Places in Virginia Beach, Virginia